Valea Dracului may refer to several rivers in Romania:

Valea Dracului, a tributary of the Prahova in Prahova County
Valea Dracului, a tributary of the Târnava Mare in Mureș County
Valea Dracului, a tributary of the Timiș in Brașov County